Nahim Marun is a Brazilian pianist.

Education

Marun’s principals piano teachers were the Brazilian pianist Isabel Mourao in São Paulo and the pianist Grant Johannesen in New York City, having completed a Master of Music degree in Piano Performance from the Mannes College of Music in New York City (under a CAPES scholarship).

He received a Doctor of Music degree from the Universidade Estadual de Campinas (under a FAPESP scholarship), with the thesis "The Piano Technique of Johannes Brahms", and pursued a Post-Doctorate at Université Paris-Sorbonne (Paris IV).

Career

Marun teaches piano performance since 1998 at Universidade Estadual Paulista UNESP. He has recorded numerous albums with other Brazilian artists.

References

Living people
Brazilian classical pianists
Male classical pianists
21st-century classical pianists
Year of birth missing (living people)